Nickelodeon Kart Racers 3: Slime Speedway is a racing video game developed by Bamtang Games and published by GameMill Entertainment. It is the third entry in the Nickelodeon Kart Racers series, following Nickelodeon Kart Racers (2018) and Nickelodeon Kart Racers 2: Grand Prix (2020). Like its predecessors, Slime Speedway is based around characters from various Nickelodeon animated series, known as "Nicktoons", participating in kart races and attempting to defeat their opponents. The game was released on October 14, 2022 for Nintendo Switch, PlayStation 4, PlayStation 5, Windows, Xbox One, and Xbox Series X/S.

Gameplay 
Nickelodeon Kart Racers 3: Slime Speedway builds on the gameplay established in previous series entries. Players must race around a track and attempt to come in first place, using items scattered on the track to hinder opponents or techniques such as drifting and midair tricks to gain speed. As in the original Nickelodeon Kart Racers, vehicles will transform into watercraft at predetermined points in the race to continue progressing through the track. The "pit crew" system from  Nickelodeon Kart Racers 2: Grand Prix returns, which allows players to equip special characters before each race that grant them active and passive abilities. These abilities can be activated once the player fills a meter by driving through a sufficient amount of slime on the track. Up to 90 pit crew characters can be unlocked in Slime Speedway. All of the core gameplay modes from the previous game return, including the "Slime Scramble" Grand Prix; Free Race; Time Trial; Challenges; and Arena.

Slime Speedway includes a base roster of 40 playable racers from various Nicktoons, with two additional characters available as downloadable content. Character karts can be customized using a variety of different parts, each of which affects the kart's gameplay statistics such as speed or handling. While each kart body was tied to a specific character in the previous games, Slime Speedway allows any character to use any kart body. In addition to karts, characters can now ride bikes as well. The game features 36 race tracks, 16 of which return from the previous game. New racers, pit crew and vehicle parts can be unlocked by winning cups in Slime Scramble, completing challenges, or purchasing them with slime tokens at the in-game garage. Slime Speedway supports both four-player local split-screen multiplayer and online multiplayer for up to 12 players.

Playable characters  

Aaahh!!! Real Monsters
 Oblina
Avatar: The Last Airbender
 Aang
 Toph
 Zuko
CatDog
 CatDog
Danny Phantom
 Danny Phantom  
Garfield
 Garfield
 Odie
Hey Arnold!
 Arnold Shortman
 Gerald Johanssen
 Helga Pataki
Invader Zim
 Zim 
 GIR
Jimmy Neutron
 Jimmy Neutron
 Cindy Vortex
The JoJo and BowBow Show Show
 JoJo Siwa
Kamp Koral: SpongeBob's Under Years
 Kamper SpongeBob
 Kamper Patrick
The Legend of Korra
 Korra

The Loud House
 Lincoln Loud
 Lucy Loud
 Clyde McBride
My Life as a Teenage Robot
 Jenny
The Patrick Star Show
 Squidina
The Ren & Stimpy Show
 Ren
 Stimpy
 Powdered Toast Man
Rocko's Modern Life
 Rocko
Rugrats
 Chuckie Finster
 Susie Carmichael
 Reptar
 Purple Reptar
SpongeBob SquarePants
 SpongeBob SquarePants
 Patrick Star 
 Sandy Cheeks
 Squidward Tentacles 
Teenage Mutant Ninja Turtles
 Leonardo
 Michelangelo
 Donatello
 Raphael
 Eastman & Laird Raphael
 April O'Neil

Development 
Nickelodeon Kart Racers 3: Slime Speedway was initially leaked by Best Buy on July 8, 2022, before being formally announced later that day. A trailer for the game was released on September 12, 2022. Unlike previous Nickelodeon Kart Racers games, Slime Speedway features full voice acting for all of the game's characters, excluding JoJo Siwa.

The game was originally announced to be released on October 7, 2022, but was later delayed one week to October 14. Players can also purchase the "Turbo Pack" downloadable content separately or packaged with the "Turbo Edition" of the game. The pack includes two additional playable characters, Zuko and "Eastman & Laird" Raphael, along with additional crew characters and vehicle parts.

Notes

References

External links 

2022 video games
Aaahh!!! Real Monsters video games
The Adventures of Jimmy Neutron: Boy Genius video games
Avatar: The Last Airbender games
Crossover racing games
Danny Phantom video games
GameMill Entertainment games
Kart racing video games
Invader Zim video games
Maximum Games games
Multiplayer and single-player video games
Nicktoon racing games
Nicktoons video games
Nintendo Switch games
PlayStation 4 games
PlayStation 5 games
Racing video games
The Ren & Stimpy Show video games
Rocko's Modern Life video games
Rugrats and All Grown Up! video games
Split-screen multiplayer games
SpongeBob SquarePants video games
Unreal Engine games
Video game sequels
Video games based on animated television series
Video games based on Garfield
Video games based on Hey Arnold!
Video games based on Teenage Mutant Ninja Turtles
Video games developed in Peru
Video games with downloadable content
Windows games
Xbox One games
Xbox Series X and Series S games